Alpha Centauri, played on-camera by Stuart Fell and voiced by Ysanne Churchman, is a fictional alien delegate for the Galactic Federation in the BBC One television series Doctor Who. The character appeared in two serials during the Third Doctor era in the early 1970s, before making a surprise cameo towards the end of "Empress of Mars" in 2017.

Character traits

Alpha Centauri is a hermaphroditic hexapod from Alpha Centauri and, being effectively genderless is referred to as "it" as opposed to "he" or "she". It is tall, green, has one large blue/green/hazel/brown eye, six arms and a high-pitched voice, wears a long yellow cape and walks with a nervous gait. It is prone to cowardice and hysterics. It has a low opinion of Earth, describing it as a "'remote and unattractive" planet, but regrets that its appearance can frighten humans. It regards females as unimportant.

Alpha Centauri is also the name of Alpha Centauri's native star system. The Alpha Centauri binary star system is second only to Proxima Centauri in proximity to the Solar System, home to the Earth.

Character history

Alpha Centauri arrives on Peladon in The Curse of Peladon (1972) as a delegate overseeing Peladon's admission to the Galactic Federation. Half a century later, Alpha Centauri is on Peladon during the events of The Monster of Peladon (1974) now as Galactic Federation Ambassador to Peladon. Alpha Centauri makes a small cameo in Empress of Mars (2017) as an ambassador for the Galactic Federation welcoming the newly-awakened Ice Warriors to the universe, again voiced by Ysanne Churchman.

Production

Ysanne Churchman was instructed by director Lennie Mayne to make the creature sound like a "gay civil servant". The same costume was worn by Stuart Fell for both appearances as the character (albeit with two different cape designs). The character reappeared in The Monster of Peladon in order to help recreate the atmosphere of Peladon depicted in the earlier serial The Curse of Peladon.

Other appearances

Alpha Centauri appears in Legacy, a Virgin New Adventure spin-off novel set on Peladon, meeting the Seventh Doctor and Benny. Alpha Centauri and Benny appeal against the Doctor's death sentence for the murder of Lady Lianna, former handmaiden to Queen Thalira, to no avail, although the Doctor is later saved. Alpha Centauri also features in Big Finish audio dramas The Bride of Peladon (2008), The Prisoner of Peladon (2009) and the audio boxset Peladon  (2022), this time voiced by Jane Goddard.

References

Alpha Centauri in fiction
Television characters introduced in 1972
Alpha Centauri
Fictional androgynes
Doctor Who aliens
Fictional cyclopes